Lars-Erik "Peppe" Håkansson (born 1 May 1950) is a Swedish curler.

He is a 1971 Swedish men's curling champion.

Teams

Personal life

References

External links
 

Living people
1950 births
Sportspeople from Karlstad
Swedish male curlers
Swedish curling champions
20th-century Swedish people